Söğütcük may refer to:
Söğütcük, Korkuteli
Söğütcük, Gölpazarı